Henry Boot (1851–1931) was the founder of Henry Boot PLC.

Henry Boot was the eldest surviving son of Charles and Ann Boot.  He was born on 9 December 1851 in Heeley, a small village two miles outside Sheffield. Henry's father had described himself as a stonemason in the 1851 census but as a farmer when the children were baptised. In the 1871 census, the 19-year-old Henry is living with his parents and shown as a joiner's apprentice.  The next year he married Hannah White (1855–1941) and moved to Napier Street, Sheffield, sandwiched between the Anglican Church and the Plymouth Brethren meeting hall. Having first worshiped at the Church, he moved to the Brethren and later formed his own Brethren meeting. Henry and Hannah had 13 children over a period of 20 years, ten of whom survived to adulthood.

Henry worked as an employee in the building industry for around 20 years before establishing his own joinery shop in 1886. The censuses record his increased status: 1891 a joiner; 1901 a builder and joiner; and 1911 a joiner builder and contractor. His accommodation kept pace as well with successive moves to larger houses – by 1911 he was living in an eleven room house in Sheffield. As is described in Henry Boot PLC the firm became an increasingly important contractor but the driving force was Henry's eldest son, Charles Boot. By the start of World War I Henry had retired from the Company.  He died on 2 November 1931 at his home on Victoria Road in Broomhall aged 80, his grave is in Crookes Cemetery in Sheffield.

References

1851 births
1931 deaths
20th-century English businesspeople